Wendy May Hutton (20 November 1940 – 23 August 2018) was a New Zealand travel and food writer who lived most of her life in Southeast Asia, including almost 30 years in Sabah, Malaysia.

Life
Hutton moved to Southeast Asia in 1968. After living for many years off and on in Singapore she settled in Sabah in 1989. She had been writing about Southeast Asian food since her early years in the area and continued to write about the region and its food. She died at her home in Sabah on 23 August 2018, at the age of 77.

Publications

Food 

Sri Lankan Cooking (co-written with Douglas Bullis, 2016) Tuttle Publishing
The Food of Bali (2015) Periplus Editions
The Food of Malaysia (2015) Periplus Editions
Green Mangoes and Lemon Grass: Southeast Asia's Best Recipes from Bangkok to Bali (2004) Tuttle Publishing
Everyday Bento (2014) Tuttle Publishing
Vietnamese Favorites (2014) Tuttle Publishing
Sensational Starters and Finger Foods (2014) Tuttle Publishing
Malaysian Favourites (2014) Tuttle Publishing
SouthEast Asia's Best Recipes (2014) Tuttle Publishing
Food of Australia (2012) Tuttle Publishing
A Touch of Tropical Spice (2012) Tuttle Publishing
A Cook's Guide to Asian Vegetables (2012) Tuttle Publishing
Handy Pocket Guide to Tropical Fruits (2012) Tuttle Publishing
Handy Pocket Guide to Asian Vegetables (2012) Periplus Editions
Singapore Food (1989) first Published date 1979 by Ure Smith, Sydney,

Travel 
Myanmar (Burma) (co-written with David Abram and Andrew Forbes, 2013) APA Publications
Discovering Sabah (2001) Kota Kinabalu Natural History Publications
The insider's guide to Malaysia & Singapore (co-written with Sean Sheehan, 1998) Gregory's
East Malaysia and Brunei (1997) Periplus Editions

References

1940 births
2018 deaths
20th-century travel writers
21st-century travel writers
Women travel writers
Cookbook writers
Women cookbook writers
New Zealand food writers
New Zealand expatriates in Malaysia